The Joint Inquiry into Intelligence Community Activities before and after the Terrorist Attacks of September 11, 2001 is the official name of the inquiry conducted by the Senate Select Committee on Intelligence and the House Permanent Select Committee on Intelligence into the activities of the U.S. Intelligence Community in connection with the September 11, 2001 attacks. The investigation began in February 2002 and the final report was released in December 2002.

Calls for inquiry
The White House, Senator Bob Graham (D-Fla.), chair of the Select Committee on Intelligence, and Representative Porter Goss (R-Fla.), chair of the House Intelligence Committee, originally rebuffed calls for an inquiry following the September 11 attacks. After December 2001, initial resolutions in the Senate called for the establishment of an independent bipartisan commission. The Joint Inquiry was announced February 14, 2002 with Senator Graham saying it would not play "the blame game about what went wrong from an intelligence perspective", and Representative Goss saying, "This particular effort focuses on the broader issues of terrorism worldwide, our capacity to counter terrorist activities and our preparedness to protect the American people at home and abroad."

Investigation

Senator Graham and Representative Goss, accompanied by their respective committee ranking minority members, Republican Senator Richard C. Shelby and Democratic Representative Nancy Pelosi, led the joint inquiry.  L. Britt Snider, the former inspector general of the CIA, was staff director. He hired a 30-person investigative staff to gather evidence and interview Central Intelligence Agency, Federal Bureau of Investigation and other intelligence and law enforcement agencies.  

However, the committee quickly ran into stonewalling, delays and attacks from Vice President Dick Cheney and United States Secretary of Defense Donald Rumsfeld, especially after an alleged leak from the committee. CNN had reported classified information that the National Security Agency had received warning of the attacks on September 10th but failed to translate and forward them. Staff director L. Britt Snider was pressured to resign in April 2002 because of questions about whether one or more of his hires had lacked proper clearance to view classified material.

The Washington Post reported in May 2002 that Senator Goss dismissed as  "a lot of nonsense" reports that five weeks before the attacks a CIA briefing had alerted President Bush about possible Osama bin Laden associates' plans to highjack aircraft; he said the investigation focus would be on why the United States intelligence bureaucracy composed of 13 agencies failed to detect the hijackers. Senator Graham said the question was why wasn't the intelligence precise. Critics on and off of Capitol Hill complained that Goss was too aligned with the CIA and Graham was insufficiently assertive.

In August 2002 unnamed individuals who had read the report revealed it contained accusations of links between the government of Saudi Arabia and the attacks. The Saudis denied this and asked that the section be made public, but President Bush refused. In December 2002 Senator Graham himself revealed in a PBS interview that "I was surprised at the evidence that there were foreign governments involved in facilitating the activities of at least some of the terrorists in the United States."

The report

The joint inquiry released their findings in December 2002.  The 832-page report (available as both S. Rept. 107-351 and H. Rept. 107-792) presents the joint inquiry’s findings and conclusions, an accompanying narrative, and a series of recommendations. The critical and comprehensive report detailed failings of the FBI and CIA to use available information, including about terrorists the CIA knew were in the United States, in order to disrupt the plots.

Redacted sections

The 28 Pages refer to a small section at the end of the inquiry commission report on the September 11 attacks which includes the details of foreign state sponsor support for Al-Qaeda prior to the attack and the possible Saudi connection with the terrorists. This part of the congressional report was classified by the George W. Bush administration. Since then, attempts were made to declassify the redacted pages by senators and political activists, among them former chairman of the Senate Intelligence Committee and the co-chairman of the joint congressional panel, Bob Graham. United States' intelligence agencies declassified the pages, and Congress publicly released the pages with some parts redacted on July 15, 2016.

Aftermath
September 11th victim families were frustrated by the unanswered questions and redacted material and demanded an independent commission.  In late 2002 President Bush and congress established the National Commission on Terrorist Attacks Upon the United States, an independent bipartisan commission popularly known as the "9/11 Commission".

In 2004 Senator Graham released his book Intelligence Matters: The CIA, the FBI, Saudi Arabia, and the Failure of America's War on Terror which dealt with issues raised by the investigation. In April 2016, both co-chairmen of the Inquiry, Bob Graham and Porter Goss, later director of the CIA, as well as other former U.S. officials, who are familiar with the entire text of the Joint Inquiry′s report, aired their belief that the U.S. government was persisting in its coverup on the Saudi Arabian government officials′ substantial aid provided to the perpetrators of the 9/11 attack and urged the Obama administration to declassify the bowdlerized pages of the report. A bipartisan effort led by Walter Jones and Stephen Lynch seeks to make the document fully available to the public.  Questions are likely to persist even if the "28 pages" are released.

In 2015, efforts began in the U.S. Senate to pass a bill that would allow victims to sue foreign powers that fund terrorist groups, such as Al Qaeda, to kill Americans on American soil. This bill became law on September 28, 2016 as the Justice Against Sponsors of Terrorism Act.

References

External links
 S. Hrg. 107–1086, Volume 1. Joint Inquiry into Intelligence Community Activities Before and after the Terrorist Attacks of September 11, 2001. Hearings before the Select Committee on Intelligence, U.S. Senate and the Permanent Select Committee On Intelligence, House of Representatives; Volume I, September 18, 19, 20, 24, and 26, 2002
 S. Hrg. 107–1086, Volume 2. Joint Inquiry into Intelligence Community Activities Before and after the Terrorist Attacks of September 11, 2001. Hearings before the Select Committee on Intelligence U.S. Senate and the Permanent Select Committee On Intelligence, House of Representatives, Volume II, October 1, 3, 8, and 17, 2002
  S. Rept. No. 107-351, 107th Congress, 2d Session; H. Rept. No. 107-792. Joint Inquiry into Intelligence Community Activities before and after the Terrorist Attacks of September 11, 2001. Report of the U.S. Senate Select Committee on Intelligence and U.S. House Permanent Select Committee on Intelligence Together with Additional Views, December 2002.

Reports of the United States government
Proceedings surrounding the September 11 attacks